Nelson or Old Nelson was George Washington's horse and one of several horses owned by Washington. He was a chestnut with a white blaze and white feet. The horse was acquired by Washington in 1779 and died in 1790 at about the age of 27, quite old for a horse in that era.  As Washington was known for being a skilled horse rider, Nelson was a significant icon for a number of years, being one of Washington's favorite horses.

History

Nelson was foaled in 1763 and was given to Washington in 1778 by Thomas Nelson of Virginia, after whom the horse was then named.  Washington stated that Nelson was his most favored horse to use during the Revolutionary War, as he was not easily provoked by gunfire.  Washington rode Nelson when accepting Cornwallis' surrender at Yorktown.  The other horse he rode during the Revolutionary War, and on whom he is more often portrayed, was his gray horse, Blueskin.

Washington ceased to ride Nelson after the war. Nelson and Blueskin were retired and lived at Mount Vernon post-war.  Washington would visit Nelson's paddock regularly, where it was reported that "the old war-horse would run, neighing, to the fence, proud to be caressed by the great master's hands."

See also
United States presidential pets
List of historical horses

References

1790 animal deaths
Individual warhorses
George Washington
Individual animals in the United States
Individual male horses
United States presidential horses